Agustín Lagos (born 8 October 2001) is an Argentine professional footballer who plays as a right-back for Atlético Tucumán.

Professional career
Lagos made his professional debut with Atlético Tucumán in a 2-2 Argentine Primera División tie with Lanús on 23 February 2020.

References

External links
 

2001 births
Living people
Sportspeople from Santiago del Estero Province
Argentine footballers
Association football defenders
Atlético Tucumán footballers
Argentine Primera División players